Julie Lemieux (born December 4, 1962) is a Canadian voice actress.

Career
Lemieux has provided the voice for characters such as Sammy Tsukino in Sailor Moon, young Darien Shields in Sailor Moon R: The Movie, and Peruru in Sailor Moon SuperS: The Movie. 

She has also played Funshine Bear in Care Bears: Journey to Joke-a-lot and The Care Bears' Big Wish Movie. She was also the voice of Dumpty in Polka Dot Shorts and Rupert Bear in the animated TV series of the same name. Lemieux also acted as Warren in Monster by Mistake and Toby of the new anime production Pandalian. 

She has recently worked on the television series What It's Like Being Alone; She has voiced Hunter Steele in the English version of Spider Riders, Ikki in Medabots Spirits, and Wilbur the Calf in Wilbur. 

She is also the voice for Renee in the TV series Jacob Two-Two, Mariah Wong in the English anime version of Beyblade, Runo in Bakugan Battle Brawlers, Antique Annie in Producing Parker, Louise in Max & Ruby, Bounce in Miss Spider's Sunny Patch Friends, Chance Happening in Grojband, Clancy in Julius Jr., Greta in Detentionaire, Bud Compson in Arthur, Fuzzy Snuggums in Spliced, Dabs Looman in Skatoony, Granny Butternut in Numb Chucks, Cali in PAW Patrol, Josee and Kelly in Total Drama Presents: The Ridonculous Race, and Flo in Total DramaRama.

Filmography

Film
 Sailor Moon R: The Movie (2000) - Young Mamoru Chiba (English dub)
 Sailor Moon SuperS: The Movie (2000) - Perle (English dub)
 Rolie Polie Olie: The Baby Bot Chase (2003) - Coochie, Coo
 Care Bears: Journey to Joke-a-lot (2004) - Funshine Bear
 Beyblade: Fierce Battle (2005) - Miss Kincaid (English dub)
 The Care Bears' Big Wish Movie (2005) - Funshine Bear
 Tidal Wave (2009) - American Woman at Beach/UN Reporter: France & Canada
 Aftershock (2010) - Woman at Basketball Park (English dub)
 Fish N Chips: The Movie (2013) - Ting, Marraine 
 The Nut Job (2014) - Girl Scout
 End of Days, Inc. (2015) - Nana (voice)
 The Nut Job 2: Nutty by Nature (2017) - Lil' Chip
 Elliot the Littlest Reindeer (2018) - Bluuberry, Olga, Computer Translator, Swedish Coach, Moshennika, Bruno, Computer Translator

Television
 Hello Kitty and Friends (1989-1994) - Jody, Julianna Scott (in "Mom Loves Me After All"), Peter Fisher (in "Heidi") (English dub)
 Keroppi and Friends (1989-1994) - Soak (Kyorosuke), Carl (Pekkle episodes only), Curtis (Koroppi, "Find the Pink Mushroom"), Speedy ("The Frog's Secret House") (English dub)
 Rupert (1992–1997) - Rupert Bear
 The Busy World of Richard Scarry (1993–1997) - Russ
 Stickin' Around (1996-1998) - Additional voices
 Rolie Polie Olie (1998-2004) - Clock Mouse ("A Totally Backwards Day"), Coochie, Coo
 Monster by Mistake (1999–2003) - Warren Patterson
 Little People (1999-2007) - Michael
 Diabolik (1999-2001) - Naomi
 Medabots Spirits (2000–2001) - Ikki, Ikki's Mom, Brass, Neutranurse, Medabot/Kilobot Announcer, Honey
 Pelswick (2000–2002) - Julie Smockford
 Maggie and the Ferocious Beast (2001–2002) - Oscar, Zach, Max
 Anne of Green Gables: The Animated Series (2001) - Fairy
 Undergrads (2001) - Rita the R.A.
 Pecola (2001–2002) - Miss Lucky
 Beyblade (2002) - Mariah Wong and Dizzi
 Moville Mysteries (2002) - Witch, Hannah's mother
 Max & Ruby (2002–2019) - Louise, Film Announcer, Grace, Oliver
 Arthur (2002–2022) - Kara, Bud Compson, Cisely Compson, Carl's Mom, Muk, Hippo, Bud
 Jacob Two-Two (2003) - Renee
 Medabots Spirit (2003–2004) - Ikki Tenryou
 King (2003-2005) Ex-Princess Populah
 Rotting Hills (2005) - Zoe
 Spider Riders (2006–2007) - Hunter Steele
 Pandalian (2006–2007) - Toby
 Magi-Nation (2007) - Evu
 Wilbur (2007-2008) - Wilbur
 The Wumblers (2007) - Bertrum
 Clang Invasion (2007) - Robin
 Total Drama Island (2007) - Heather's Mom
 Wayside (2007–2008) - Mrs. Gorf
 Magi-Nation (2007–2010) - Iyori, Sorranther
 Poppets Town (2007-2021) - Cocori
 Bakugan Battle Brawlers (2008–2009) - Runo Misaki, Sirenoid, Harpus, Lars Lion and Komba O'Charlie
 Cyberchase (2008–2010) - Fergie, Mayor, Shari Spotter, Tappy
 Producing Parker (2009–2011) - Antique Annie
 Bakugan Battle Brawlers: New Vestroia (2009–2010) - Runo Misaki, Sirenoid, Lars Lion (English dub)
 Bakugan: Gundalian Invaders (2010–2011) - Runo Misaki, Queen Serena (English dub)
 Bakugan: Mechtanium Surge (2011–2012) - Runo Misaki (English dub)
 The Amazing Spiez! (2009–2012) - Tony Clark
 Busytown Mysteries (2007–2010) - Pig Will, Hilda 
 Spliced (2009–2010) - Fuzzy Snuggums
 Skatoony (2010–2013) - Dabs Looman
 The Cat in the Hat Knows a Lot About That! (2011–2012) - Twitch, Milly, Jilly
 Almost Naked Animals (2011–2013) - Batty
 Detentionaire (2011–2013) - Greta, Cassandra
 The Beet Party (2012) - Boom-Ka, Wooga Booga
 Grojband (2012–2013) - Chance Happening
 Scaredy Squirrel (2013) - Additional voices
 The Day My Butt Went Psycho! (2013) - Gran
 Grojband (2013–2014) - Chance Happening
 PAW Patrol (2013–present) - Cali
 Julius Jr. (2013–2014) - Clancy
 Camp Lakebottom (2013–2016) - Additional voices 
 Peg + Cat (2014) - Flat Woman
 Numb Chucks (2014–2016) - Grandma Butternut
 Total Drama Presents: The Ridonculous Race (2015) - Josee (26 episodes), Kelly (10 episodes)
 Inspector Gadget (2015–2018) - Dr. Ithica Marvins, Computer, Pasha
 The Adventures of Napkin Man! (2015–2016) - Mrs. Bailom, Stretcho Girl, Strong Stella
 PJ Masks (2015–2016) - Additional voices
 Rusty Rivets (2016) - Whirly, Crush
 Freaktown (2016) - Princess Boo Boo the Bouncy
 Fangbone! (2016-2017) - Hammerscab, The Toe
 Wishfart (2017) - Janice
 Top Wing (2017) - Additional voices
 The Magic School Bus Rides Again (2017) - Additional voices
 Mysticons (2017–2018) - The Dragon Disk, Serena Snakecharmer
 True and the Rainbow Kingdom (2017–2019) - Mila, TTT Bus
 Wild Kratts (2017–present) - Paisley Paver
 Gary and His Demons (2018) - Mrs. Cranbrook, Mom, Succubus
 Cupcake & Dino: General Services (2018–present) - Grandma Steak
 Total DramaRama (2018–2019) - Flo
 Bakugan: Battle Planet (2019) - Phaedrus
 Snoopy in Space (2019–present) - Bird Bud #3
 Trailer Park Boys: The Animated Series (2019) - Freja
 Bigfoot (2019) - French Agent #1
 Hero Elementary (2020) - Mrs. Mangia, Soccer Coach, Kite Flying Boy
 Bitmoji TV (2020) - Demon Bear 
 Alien TV (2020) - Pixbee
 Doomsday Brothers (2020) - Judith
 Corn & Peg (2020) - Ferris, Ferdy's Grandmare
 Glowbies (2021) - Drippy
 Transformers: BotBots (2022) - Lady Macron, Jacqueline
 Work It Out Wombats! (2023) - Carly, Cece, and Clyde

Video games
 Suikoden Tierkreis (2009) - Roberto
 Bakugan Battle Brawlers (2009) - Runo Misaki, Komba
 Hearthstone (2014) - Additional voices

References

External links
 
 
 

1962 births
Living people
20th-century Canadian comedians
20th-century Canadian actresses
21st-century Canadian comedians
21st-century Canadian actresses
Canadian women comedians
Canadian voice actresses
Canadian film actresses
Canadian television actresses
Canadian video game actresses
Comedians from Quebec
Actresses from Quebec
French Quebecers
People from Val-des-Sources